Zari is a town in the Palghar district of Maharashtra, India. It is located in the Talasari taluka.

Demographics 

According to the 2011 census of India, Zari has 806 households. The effective literacy rate (i.e. the literacy rate of population excluding children aged 6 and below) is 49.18%.

References 

Villages in Talasari taluka